The Lahontan redside (Richardsonius egregius) is a cyprinid fish of the Great Basin in eastern California and western Nevada.

Lahontan redsides are noted for their breeding colors, consisting of a bright red stripe with a yellow border on each side. At other times, the stripe is still visible, but the red is much reduced, leaving a gradual transition from the olive-colored back to silvery underside. Overall shape is slender, with a large eye and terminal mouth. The dorsal fin has 7-8 rays, while the anal fin has 8-10 rays. The pectoral fins are somewhat long, the tips reaching nearly to the bases of the pelvic fins. The tail is deeply forked. Total length ranges up to 17 cm, but an 8 cm length is more typical of mature adults.

They are found in a variety of habitats within their range, primarily feeding on small invertebrates. Stream populations shoal near the surface of quiet pools, where they catch drifting insects, while in lakes they form groups in the littoral zone, generally preferring to stay over rocky bottoms, and eat a combination of surface insects, insect larvae, and planktonic crustacea. When the temperatures drop during winter, they move to deeper water and remain nearly motionless near the bottom.

The spawning season lasts from late May to August, with the high point coming during the second half of June. They look for shallow water, either at lake margins, or in stream pools with sand and gravel bottoms, then form into swirling groups of 20-100 fish just above the bottom. The actual egglaying and fertilizing consists of subgroups swimming down and pressing themselves on the bottom, the eggs then adhering to the rocks and crevices.

The range of these redsides is defined by the old Lake Lahontan basin. Rivers include the Truckee River, Carson River, etc. They are also found in upper parts of the Feather River, probably as accidental introductions via the bait bucket. They are abundant across their range, and successful colonizers around its edges, so they are not considered threatened in any way.

A variety of common names make reference to the breeding colors, including redside minnow, red-striped shiner, Lahontan redshiner, etc.

References

 
 Peter B. Moyle, Inland Fishes of California (University of California Press, 2002), pp. 134–136

Richardsonius
Fauna of the Great Basin
Fish described in 1858